Musarrat Nazir Khawaja (born 13 October 1940) is a Pakistani singer and film actress, who acted in many Urdu and Punjabi films. She, many years later, also sang solo, mostly wedding and folk songs.

Early life
Her parents were a Punjabi middle-class family Kashmiri origin from Lahore.  Her father Khwaja Nazir Ahmed, worked as a registered contractor in Lahore Municipal corporation. Early in her life, her parents wanted her to be a doctor, and provided her with the best possible education they could afford. Musarrat passed the matriculation examination (10th grade) with distinction and passed the intermediate examination (12th grade) from Kinnaird College in Lahore.

Career
She had keen interest in music and began singing for Radio Pakistan in the early 1950s. However, insufficient money from the radio took her to the film director, Anwar Kamal Pasha in 1955. She explained to Pasha about her strong desire to sing for the movies. Instead, Pasha suggested to her to become an actress. Musarrat needed her parents' approval. Pasha himself met Musarrat's father and convinced him to allow his daughter to work in the movie industry as a singer and actress.

Anwar Kamal Pasha changed Musarrat's name to Chandani and signed her up for a side role in his movie. Hence, Chandani made her debut with Sabiha Khanum and Nayyar Sultana in Pasha's film Qatil in 1955. Her role was secondary but effective.

Sheikh Lateef of Capital Films, Lahore planned to make a Punjabi film, 'Pattan (1955)'. Lateef's friend, poet and script writer, Baba Aalam Siah Posh, advised him to cast Chandani (Musarrat Nazir) in the film. Sheikh Lateef agreed. This was the debut of Musarrat Nazir in Punjabi films, with a nickname Chandani. Then Chandani appeared in the hit Punjabi film, Pattan (1955), with her real name, Musarrat Nazir.

She played the lead role opposite Santosh Kumar in Pattan (1955). The producer was Sheikh Lateef and the film was directed by Luqman. The film Pattan opened the doors for Musarrat in the Punjabi film industry, which led her to the hit film Patay Khan (1955). She was the supporting actress. The film was produced by film actress Shammi and Musarrat Nazir acted in a supporting role along with Noor Jehan and Aslam Pervaiz. Her main competitor actresses, in those days, were Sabiha Khanum, Yasmin and Noor Jehan.

Personal life
She was born on 13 October 1940 . She is married to a physician Arshad Majeed and has lived in Canada since 1965. They have three grown-up children in 2005. Musarrat Nazir gave up her film career that was then at its peak for her would-be husband and agreed to move to Canada with him.

Musarrat Nazir and Arshad Majeed wanted to return to Pakistan and settle in Lahore in the late 1970s. Arshad Majeed wanted to set up a hospital in Lahore and they had gone ahead and bought a home there for this purpose which they still own and maintain in 2005. After spending a lot of money, months of struggle and running around, Arshad Majeed gave up.

Filmography
Musarrat also gave performances in Pakistan cinema's greatest melodramas like the films Mahi Munda (1956) and Yakke Wali (1957).

Following is the list of Musarrat's films:

Qatil (1955)
Pattan (1955), 
Paatay Khan (1955) 
Mahi Munda (1956) 
Peengaan (1956) 
Kismet (1956) 
Mirza Sahiban (1956)  
Guddi Guddi (1956) 
Baghi (1956), 
Aankh Ka Nasha (1957)
Baap Ka Gunah (1957) 
Palkaan (1957) 
Yakke Wali (1957) 
Naya Zamana (1957) 
Sehti (1957) 
Jatti (1958)
Zehr-e-Ishq (1958)  
Street number 77 
Seestaan (1957) 
Thandi Sarak (1957) 
Jaan-E-Bahar (1958) 
Lukkan Miti (1959) 
Jaidad (1959) 
Kartar Singh 
Raaz (1959) 
Sola Aanay (1959) 
Jhoomer (1959) 
Gul Badan (1960) 
Naukari (1960) 
Sunehre Sapne (1961) 
Shaheed (1962) 
Ishq Par Zor Nahin (1963) 
Chotay Sarkaar 
Mangol (1961) 
Muftbar (1961) 
Gulfam'' (1961) Bahadur (1967)

The film song Us bay wafa ka sheher hai in the mega-hit film Shaheed (1962), is considered to be one of the popular songs in 2022. Even after she retired from her film career in 1963, she had continued to sing for Pakistan Television until recently.

 Discography 
Musarrat Nazir made an appearance on Pakistani television's Tariq Aziz Show in 1983. Songs from that show became highly popular in Pakistan.

Her popular songs are listed below:

 Gulshan ki baharon mein Mera laung gawacha (1983), song lyrics by Khawaja Pervez was a runaway hit song
 Chalay to kat hi jaaye ga safar aahistah, aahistah Apnay haathoan ki lakiroan mein Lathe di chader uttay saleti rung mahiya, a traditional folk song of western Punjab
 Chitta kukkar banairey tay Mehndi ni mehndi Jogi (1985)

 Awards and nominations 
 Nigar Award for Best Actress in 1958, for the film Zehr-e-Ishq.
 Nigar Award for Best Actress in 1959, for the film Jhoomer.
 Nigar Award for Best Actress in 1962, for the film Shaheed''.
 Pride of Performance Award from the President of Pakistan in 1989.

References

External links
 
 

1940 births
Living people
Pakistani musicians
Punjabi-language singers
Pakistani people of Kashmiri descent
Punjabi people
Kinnaird College for Women University alumni
Actresses from Lahore
Singers from Lahore
Pakistani film actresses
Recipients of the Pride of Performance
Nigar Award winners
20th-century Pakistani actresses
Pakistani folk singers
Pakistani emigrants to Canada
20th-century Pakistani women singers